Wadi Feynan or Wadi Faynan is a major wadi (seasonal river valley) and region in southern Jordan, on the border between Tafilah Governorate and Aqaba and Ma'an Governorates. It originates in the southern Jordanian Highlands with the confluence of Wadi Dana and Wadi Ghuweyr, and drains into the Dead Sea via Wadi Araba.

Historically, the area had the largest copper deposits in the Southern Levant, which were intensively exploited from the Chalcolithic (4500–3100 BCE) through to the Mamluk period (1250–1516 CE). It also has a number of significant early prehistoric sites.

Part of the wadi is included in the Dana Biosphere Reserve. The Royal Society for the Conservation of Nature (RSCN) opened the first of its eco hotels, the Feynan Ecolodge, there in 2005.

Archaeological sites 
 Barqa al-Hetiye
 Khirbat Faynan
 Khirbat en-Nahas
 Wadi Faynan 16

Excavations 
Archaeological sites in Faynan have been extensively excavated by the Edom Lowlands Regional Archaeology Project, led by Thomas E. Levy and Mohammad Najjar. Levy and Najjar have argued that Iron Age sites in the region relate to the earliest phases of the Biblical kingdom of Edom. These scholars, along with Erez Ben-Yosef, also argue that Pharaoh Shoshenk I of Egypt (the Biblical "Shishak"), who attacked Jerusalem in the 10th century BC, encouraged the trade and production of copper instead of destroying the region.

See also
Timna Valley

References

External links
 Photos of Feynan at the American Center of Research

Feynan